Jakob Westholm (11 May 1877 in Palmse Parish (now Haljala Parish), Kreis Wierland – 9 March 1935 in Tallinn) was an Estonian educator and politician. He was a member of the I, II, III and IV Riigikogu, representing the Estonian People's Party.

He was not original member of I Riigikogu, but was chosen in order to replace Adam Bachmann. Westholm, a teacher and headmaster, founded the Jakob Westholm Gymnasium as a private school for boys in Tallinn in 1907. The school is now a co-educational primary and secondary school and still bears his name. Westholm was instrumental in helping to create the legal and foundational basis of the Estonian education system.

References

1877 births
1935 deaths
People from Haljala Parish
People from Kreis Wierland
Estonian People's Party politicians
Members of the Estonian Constituent Assembly
Members of the Riigikogu, 1920–1923
Members of the Riigikogu, 1923–1926
Members of the Riigikogu, 1926–1929
Members of the Riigikogu, 1929–1932
Estonian educators
20th-century Estonian educators
University of Tartu alumni
Estonian military personnel of the Estonian War of Independence
Burials at Rahumäe Cemetery